Blue Side of Lonesome is a studio album by Jim Reeves, released posthumously in 1967 on RCA Victor. The album was produced by Chet Atkins.

Track listing

Charts

References 

1964 albums
Jim Reeves albums
RCA Victor albums
Albums produced by Chet Atkins